Graham Barrow (born 13 June 1954) is an English former footballer who has since become a professional manager in the English game. He is currently working for Exeter City as a Tactical Insights Coach for former Wigan Athletic manager Gary Caldwell.

Playing career

Having previously played for Chorley and Southport, Barrow first entered the Football League at the relatively late age of 27 in August 1981 when he signed for Wigan Athletic from Altrincham for £10,000. He became a vital part of manager Larry Lloyd's promotion winning side, playing as a hard man in midfield, and further endeared himself to Wigan fans by putting in a hard working performance in the Associate Members' Cup final at Wembley Stadium in 1985 despite playing in the unfamiliar position of forward. He left the club for Chester City in 1986 for £6,000, after 212 appearances in all competitions for the Latics (179 games, 36 goals in the League).

Barrow had a difficult start at Chester, suffering five bookings in his first seven games, and in November 1986 he considered a move to Blackpool. But he opted to stay with the Blues and went on to make 298 first team appearances over the next eight years, mainly as captain. He combined his playing role with an assistant manager position to Harry McNally from 1988–89 onwards. On the final day of the 1991–92 season, Barrow scored a late winner in Chester's final home game at Moss Rose against Leyton Orient to seal Division Three survival for the club.

2023 - Wigan Athletic 1st team coach (Current team)

Management & coaching

Chester, Wigan and Rochdale
Barrow began his managerial career with Chester City in 1992 (as player–manager), after collecting seven points from four games in caretaker charge. Although the team was relegated to the Football League Third Division in 1993, Barrow inspired the Blues to bounce back the next season and gain promotion, but he resigned in the summer of 1994 amid frustration at key players leaving and a lack of financial backing from the board. He retired from playing following his departure, with his final appearance being in Chester's win 3–2 win over Preston North End on 2 April 1994, just two months before his 40th birthday.

He returned to Wigan as manager early in 1994–95 and rescued the Latics from relegation to the Football Conference. He was in charge of Rochdale from 1996 to 1999, although the club failed to gain any success and he left after a third successive bottom-half placing. A spell as assistant–manager at Notts County followed before returning to Chester as manager on 31 May 2000, shortly after their relegation to the Conference. Although Chester finished well out of the promotion race in eighth position, Barrow managed to guide the club to an FA Cup third round tie with Blackburn Rovers after eliminating Football League sides Plymouth Argyle and Oxford United. He also led them to the FA Trophy semi–finals and victory in the final of the Nationwide Variety Club Trophy, with the players saying he had "single-handedly put Chester back on the football map". Despite his cup successes, Barrow was sacked in June 2001, a move largely unpopular with supporters.

Bury
He was manager of Bury, from January 2004 after a spell as assistant-manager to Andy Preece. However the club did not progress satisfactorily and as a result Barrow was dismissed in September 2005.
He returned to Chester at the end of the season, becoming assistant to manager Mark Wright. They were sacked together on 29 April 2007. 
He returned to working in football the following January, when he continued his trend of going back to former clubs in north-west England by becoming assistant–manager to Graham Heathcote at Altrincham.

Return to Wigan
In July 2009, Barrow returned to Wigan as first–team coach under new manager Roberto Martínez.

Due to Owen Coyle's sacking on 2 December 2013, Barrow took charge of the team for their game against Leeds United two days later, which they lost 2–0. On 7 December, Uwe Rösler was named full-time manager.

Following the sacking of Gary Caldwell in October 2016 Barrow again took charge on a caretaker basis, overseeing a 1–0 victory over Cardiff City on 29 October. In March 2017, Wigan appointed Barrow as caretaker manager for the remainder of the 2016–17 season after the sacking of Warren Joyce but he was unable to prevent relegation to League One.

Wrexham
On 3 July 2018, Barrow was appointed as assistant manager to new Wrexham manager Sam Ricketts in the National League. Amidst speculation that Ricketts was about to take the job at Shrewsbury Town, Barrow took caretaker charge alongside goalkeeper coach Jussi Jääskeläinen and coach Carl Darlington for Wrexham's FA Cup second round match with Newport County on 1 December 2018, which ended in a 0–0 draw. When Ricketts' departure to Shrewsbury was confirmed two days later, Barrow was placed in interim charge.

Shrewsbury Town
In June 2019 he joined Shrewsbury Town as assistant manager to Sam Ricketts.

Managerial statistics

Honours
Player
 Football League Division Four (League Two) promotion as third-placed team, 1981–82 (Wigan Athletic).
 Associate Members' Cup winners, 1984–85 (Wigan Athletic).
 Alliance Premier League champions, 1979–80 & 1980–81 (Altrincham).

Manager
 Football League Division Three (League Two) runners-up, 1993–94 (Chester City – player/manager).
 Nationwide Variety Club Trophy winners, 2000–01 (Chester City).

Bibliography

References

External links
 Graham Barrow League Managers Association Profile
 Graham Barrow Altrincham career profile (see third player down)
 BBC feature on Barrow (2008)

1954 births
Living people
Sportspeople from Chorley
English footballers
Association football midfielders
Chorley F.C. players
Southport F.C. players
Altrincham F.C. players
Wigan Athletic F.C. players
Chester City F.C. players
English Football League players
National League (English football) players
English football managers
Chester City F.C. managers
Wigan Athletic F.C. managers
Rochdale A.F.C. managers
Bury F.C. managers
English Football League managers
National League (English football) managers
Wigan Athletic F.C. non-playing staff
Wrexham A.F.C. non-playing staff
Wrexham A.F.C. managers
Shrewsbury Town F.C. non-playing staff